The 2021 Melbourne Storm season was the 24th in the club's history competing in the 2021 NRL season. The team is coached by Craig Bellamy, coaching the club for his 19th consecutive season. On 19 February 2021, the Melbourne Storm announced that Jesse Bromwich and Dale Finucane succeeded Cameron Smith, as co-captains of the club.

The season was again affected by the COVID-19 pandemic in Australia, with the club forced to relocate to Queensland for much of the season.

Melbourne claimed the J. J. Giltinan Shield for the fifth time as minor premiers, setting a number of club records (21  wins; 815 points). Melbourne tied the league record for most consecutive wins with 19 victories between rounds 4-23.

In a rematch of the 2020 NRL Grand Final, second placed Penrith Panthers knocked Melbourne out of the 2021 NRL finals in the preliminary final, ending hopes of back-to-back premierships.

Season summary
 World Club Challenge – On 20 November 2020 it was announced that the World Club challenge (which the Storm would be competing in) would be postponed until later in 2021 owing to the push back of seasons due to COVID-19 and the ongoing pandemic itself preventing overseas travel, articles later in 2021 confirmed that it has been cancelled and the 2022 challenge is also under a cloud.
 12 February – Seven Melbourne players (Josh Addo-Carr, Nelson Asofa-Solomona, Jesse Bromwich, Kenneath Bromwich, Jahrome Hughes, Brandon Smith and Reimis Smith) are forced to withdraw from the 2021 All Stars match due to a Victoria COVID-19 border closure.
 18 February – Due to the possibility of travel restrictions, Newcastle Knights refuse to travel to Melbourne for their scheduled pre-season trial game at Casey Fields, with the match relocated to Albury.
 19 February – The club announces that Jesse Bromwich and Dale Finucane have succeeded Cameron Smith, as co-captains of the club.
 10 March – Cameron Smith officially announces his retirement from the game. This was done at a ceremony unveiling statues of himself and also Billy Slater at AAMI Park.
 Round 1 – The Storm open the 2021 NRL season with a win against South Sydney Rabbitohs at AAMI Park. This continued the streak of not having lost a Round 1 game since the 2001 NRL season. Tyson Smoothy also made his NRL debut.
 Round 4 – After two straight losses, the Storm demolish the Broncos 40–6. Ryan Papenhuyzen scored 4 tries in 11 minutes to equal the club record for the most scored in a single game, he also scored 5 goals and with a combined points total of 26, put him in second place for club record  for the most points scored in a game. Christian Welch played his 100th NRL game and Trent Loiero made his debut.
 Round 7 – Melbourne retain the Michael Moore Trophy winning 42–20 against the Warriors. George Jennings is substituted after 12 minutes due to concussion resulting from foul play, with Chris Lewis activated as a reserve player under the new NRL 18th man rule.
 Round 9 – Josh Addo-Carr scores a club record 6 tries in a game, becoming the first player in 71 years to score 6 tries in a first grade game in Australia.
 Round 10 – Melbourne host St George Illawarra at Suncorp Stadium during day three of the 2021 NRL Magic Round. Dragons centre Tyrell Fuimaono is sent off for a high tackle on Ryan Papenhuyzen who is left heavily concussed, with Dean Ieremia coming on as 18th man.
 28 May – Storm announce that their Round 13 match had been moved to Sunshine Coast Stadium due to a COVID-19 outbreak in Melbourne. The club had been staying for a mid-season camp at their 2020 home away from home since just before Round 10.
 Round 13 – Reimis Smith is the first player sent to the sin bin from the Storm for the season, after a high tackle on Titans' Jaimin Jolliffe.
 8 June – Storm announce that their Round 15 match has also been moved to Sunshine Coast Stadium.
 10 June – Storm sign former Parramatta forward Tepai Moeroa from the NSW Waratahs, where he had been playing rugby union since 2020.
 25 June – Sydney Roosters move their Round 16 home game against Melbourne to McDonald Jones Stadium, Newcastle, due to a COVID-19 outbreak in Sydney.
 29 June – After 46 days away, Storm return home to Melbourne after checking out of their extended Sunshine Coast stay.
 Round 16 – Melbourne score 40+ points for the 10th time for the season, the first team to achieve that feat in Australian first grade rugby league.
 14 July – Melbourne announce that they have broken the membership record, signing up over 27,000 members.
 15 July – A COVID-19 outbreak in Victoria, saw the club forced to again relocate to Queensland, with the venue for the Round 18 game against Newcastle changed to CBus Super Stadium.
 Round 18 – Melbourne Storm score their 14th consecutive win with a 48 - 4 thrashing of the Newcastle Knights. The win was notable because they broke an 86 year old Rugby League record in the process, surpassing the Sydney Roosters’ 1935 record for the most points scored after 17 games in one year. At the end of the game the Storm points for was 632 the 1935 Roosters was 614.
 23 July – The NRL confirm that Melbourne's Round 20 (home) and 21 (away) games will be played at Suncorp Stadium with the entire competition based in Queensland.
 Round 19 – The Storm defeat the Cowboys in a close game by four points to  win their 15th consecutive game and equal the club record for the most consecutive wins. Josh Addo-Carr also scored his 100th NRL try.
 25 July – Club co-captain Dale Finucane announces that he will leave the Melbourne Storm at seasons end and join Cronulla Sharks in 2022 on a 4-year contract.
 26 July – Nicho Hynes is nominated as the club representative for the NRL's Ken Stephen Medal for his work with young Indigenous children and as an ambassador for the Starlight Foundation.
 27 July – Head coach Craig Bellamy agrees to a new long-term deal with the club to stay as coach in 2022, with a flexible role contract in place until the end of the 2026 NRL season.
 30 July –  Ryan Papenhuyzen signs a new contract to stay with Melbourne until the end of the 2025 NRL season.
 Round 20 – Melbourne defeat the Penrith Panthers to score their 16th straight win and set a new club record for the most consecutive wins. Ryan Papenhuyzen also played his 50th Game. The other notable aspect of the win was that at the end of the game the Storm points differential was 465 points, the largest in Australian rugby league history.
 3 August – Reports surface that Melbourne Storm Chairman Matt Tripp put forward a proposal to the NRL to shift the 2021 NRL Grand Final to the MCG for a $10m fee.
 6 August –  forward Felise Kaufusi extends his contract with the club until the end of the 2022 season.
 Round 21 – Melbourne speed past 700 points scored in the regular season for only the second time in club history, passing the previous best of 704 from 2001. Tepai Moeroa makes his Storm debut, his first NRL game since playing against Melbourne in the 2019 NRL finals.
 Round 22 – Melbourne Storm score their 18th consecutive win, 26–16 over Canberra and in doing so set a new club record for the most points scored in a season (surpassing 2004's 733 points in 26 games including finals).
 17 August – Jordan Grant signs a contract to join the top-30 squad from 2022, while Isaac Lumelume signs on to extend his contract with the club. Melbourne also announce the signing of Bronson Garlick on a development contact.
 Round 23 – With their 19th straight victory, Melbourne equal the record of the 1975 Easts team for the longest winning streak Australian rugby league history. Captain Jesse Bromwich wins his 200th first grade game in his 269th appearance, to become the fastest person to win 200 games. In his first Storm game since 2019, Marion Seve scores a try as Melbourne score 30+ points for the 14th time for the 2021 season. In addition, Josh Addo-Carr's two tries increased his season total to 23, equaling the club record for most tries scored in a season.
 Round 24 – Parramatta Eels inflict Melbourne's first loss since March, ending the 19-game winning streak. The loss is Melbourne's first in Queensland since 2017, a stretch of 29 matches.
 30 August – Christian Welch, Jahrome Hughes, Brandon Smith and Nicho Hynes are nominated for the RLPA's Players' Champion Award for the 2021 season.
 Round 25 – Melbourne secure their fifth J. J. Giltinan Shield, defeating Cronulla-Sutherland Sharks to take the minor premiership on points difference ahead of Penrith. It is the eighth time the club has finished atop the NRL ladder. Daniel Atkinson makes his NRL debut, after only two Queensland Cup games; while captain Dale Finucane plays his 150th game for the club.
 Finals Week 1 – Melbourne Storm defeat the Manly Sea Eagles to earn a bye and progress directly to the Week 3 - Preliminary finals. Ryan Papenhuyzen scores 24 points including the clubs first 2-point field goal.
 Finals Week 3 – In a rematch of the 2020 NRL Grand Final, Penrith defeat Melbourne 10–6 at Suncorp Stadium, the club's first loss in a finals game at the venue. Early injuries to Christian Welch and Brandon Smith proving costly in what was Dale Finucane, Josh Addo-Carr and Nicho Hynes' last game for the club. The defeat ending hopes of a back-to-back premiership.
 27 September – Craig Bellamy wins his sixth Coach of the Year award at the 2021 Dally M Awards. Justin Olam and Brandon Smith both make the Dally M Team of the Year for the first time.
 28 September – It is confirmed by CEO Justin Rodski that the NRL Integrity Unit is investigating Cameron Munster, Brandon Smith and Chris Lewis after video emerged on social media of the trio partying following the club's elimination from the NRL finals.
 5 October – The NRL issues breach notices to Cameron Munster, Brandon Smith and Chris Lewis following the NRL Integrity Unit investigation. All three players are alleged to have brought the game into disrepute and are sanctioned with one-match suspensions and varying fines. The club also enforces additional penalties including suspended fines, removal from leadership groups, and additional behavioral measures.
 20 December – The NRL formally stands down Tui Kamikamica under the league's no-fault stand-down policy, due to pending assault occasioning bodily harm charges against the Fijian. Kamikamica was earlier stood down by the club when news of the charges emerged in November, but was allowed to return to training.

Milestone games

Fixtures

Pre-season 
Source:

Regular season
Source:
(GP) - Golden Point extra time
(pen) - Penalty try

Finals 
Source:

Ladder

Coaching staff
Craig Bellamy – Head Coach
Stephen Kearney – Assistant Coach
 Marc Brentnall – Assistant Coach
 Aaron Bellamy – Development Coach
 Ryan Hinchcliffe – Development Coach
 Frank Ponissi – Football Director
Ryan Hoffman – Football Administration Coordinator
 Craig McRae – Kicking & Catching Coach
 Billy Slater – Specialist Coach (Part-time)
 Cooper Cronk - Halves Coach (Part-time)
 Tim Glasby - Recruitment Officer and Pathways Manager
 Ben Jack – Victoria Thunderbolts (Under-21s) Head Coach
 Jon Buchanan – Easts Tigers Feeder Club Coach
 Sam Mahwinney – Sunshine Coast Falcons Feeder Club Coach

2021 squad
List current as of 14 June 2021

Player movements
Source:

Losses
 Sandor Earl to Retirement
 Tino Fa'asuamaleaui to Gold Coast Titans
 Ricky Leutele to Huddersfield Giants
 Paul Momirovski to Wests Tigers  
 Cameron Smith to Retirement
 Kelma Tuilagi to Wests Tigers 
 Albert Vete to Hull Kingston Rovers
 Suliasi Vunivalu to Queensland Reds, Super Rugby

Gains
 Harry Grant from Wests Tigers 
 George Jennings from Parramatta Eels
 Reimis Smith  from Canterbury Bulldogs
 Tepai Moeroa from NSW Waratahs, Super Rugby 
 Tyran Wishart from St George Illawarra Dragons

Representative honours
This table lists all players who have played a representative match in 2021.

Statistics 
This table contains playing statistics for all Melbourne Storm players to have played in the 2021 NRL season.
Statistics sources:

Scorers

Most points in a game: 26 points 
 Round 4 - Ryan Papenhuyzen (4 Tries, 5 Goals) vs Brisbane Broncos

Most tries in a game: 6  
 Round 9 - Josh Addo-Carr vs South Sydney Rabbitohs

Winning games

Highest score in a winning game: 66 points
 Round 15 vs Wests Tigers

Lowest score in a winning game: 20 points
 Round 6 vs Sydney Roosters
 Round 13 vs Gold Coast Titans
 Round 19 vs North Queensland Cowboys

Greatest winning margin: 50 points
 Round 9 vs South Sydney Rabbitohs
 Round 15 vs Wests Tigers

Greatest number of games won consecutively: 19 
 Round 4 - Round 23

Losing games

Highest score in a losing game: 12 points
 Round 2 vs Parramatta Eels

Lowest score in a losing game: 6 points
 Preliminary Final vs Penrith Panthers

Greatest losing margin: 12 points
 Round 24 vs Parramatta Eels

Greatest number of games lost consecutively: 2
 Round 2 - Round 3

Jerseys
In December 2020, Melbourne Storm announced a new 5 year sponsorship and apparel partnership agreement with British sportswear company, Castore replacing the partnership with ISC. Castore will produce new supporter wear and a new jersey for season 2021, the design was announced on 14 January 2021.

Home

The home jersey features a classic V shape on the chest and the return of yellow to the jersey for the first time since 2018. Among the special features Castore has incorporated in the new jersey is a lightning bolt design on the sleeve and the inclusion of a Big V logo on the inner collar as a continuation of the Our Home, Victoria acknowledgment which began during the 2020 season to honor Storm’s home state. The Victoria acknowledgment logo returned to the front of the jersey from Round 20 onwards.

Away

The away jersey, worn when the home jersey creates a clash with the opposition, is a similar design to the home jersey but in majority white; worn with navy blue shorts and either navy blue (Round 2) or white socks with navy blue cuffs (Rounds 3, 9, 14, 16, 19).

Special

Round 7 - Melbourne wore a unique jersey with sublimated Anzac Day details including a large red Remembrance poppy, silhouettes of soldiers, and the Anzac Appeal logo.

Round 12 & 18 - An Indigenous Round jersey for the first time based on a white jersey template, designed by Melbourne AFLW player Krstel Petrevski. The jersey features the names of the 16 past and present Indigenous Storm players.

Round 21 – A white heritage jersey based upon the clash design worn in the club's first ever trial game, and worn once during the 1998 NRL season.

Awards

Trophy Cabinet
2021 J. J. Giltinan Shield
 2021 Michael Moore Trophy

Melbourne Storm Awards Night
Held at The Glasshouse, Melbourne, Friday 10 December 2021. 
 Melbourne Storm Player of the Year: Jahrome Hughes
 Billy Slater Rookie of the Year: Dean Ieremia
 Melbourne Storm Members' Player of Year: Jahrome Hughes
 Melbourne Storm Most Improved: Nicho Hynes
 Melbourne Storm Best Back: Ryan Papenhuyzen
 Melbourne Storm Best Forward: Brandon Smith
 Cooper Cronk Feeder Club Player of the Year: Marion Seve
 Darren Bell U20s Player of the Year: Antonio Sanele
 Greg Brentnall Young Achievers Award (U18s): Jay Natapu
 Mick Moore Club Person of the Year: Meirion Jones (Head Physiotherapist)
 Chairman’s Award: Michael Christo (General Manager – Corporate Affairs, Government Relations and Community)
 Best Try: George Jennings, Round 18 vs Knights

Dally M Awards Night
Held at  Howard Smith Wharves, Brisbane on Monday 27 September 2021.
 Dally M Centre of the Year: Justin Olam
 Dally M Hooker of the Year:  Brandon Smith
 Dally M Coach of the Year: Craig Bellamy
 Therabody NRL Young Gun of the Year: Nicho Hynes
 Peter Frilingos Headline Moment: Melbourne Storm's 19-match winning streak

Rugby League Players’ Association Awards
 Dennis Tutty Award: Christian Welch
 RLPA Centre of the Year: Justin Olam
 RLPA Hooker of the Year: Brandon Smith

Additional awards
 Spirit of Anzac Medal: Jahrome Hughes
 NRL Community Young Person of the Year: Halle Braybon 
 New Zealand Kiwi Player of the Year: Jahrome Hughes

Notes

References

Melbourne Storm seasons
Melbourne Storm season